This is a list of Australian domestic television series which debuted, or are scheduled to debut, in 2009.

Premieres

Free-to-air television

Nine Network

SBS One

Community television

Subscription television

Unknown networks

Notes

References

2009 in Australian television